Nikolay Binev (5 July 1934 - 8 December 2003) was a Bulgarian theater and film actor. During most of his career he was the soul and history of the Mladezhki Theater, Sofia and remained devoted to it until the end of his life.
In 2006, in his honor, the theater was named after him.

Biography and Career
Binev was born on 5 July 1934 in the town of Sliven, Bulgaria. In 1958 he graduated as an actor in Krastyo Sarafov National Academy for Theatre and Film Arts.

In 1959, after several months on the stage with the Ruse Theater, Binev entered the Mladezhki Theater, Sofia where he stayed until the end of his life. "...Binev was an encyclopedist and a man with a unique sense of humor..." said the director Andrey Avramov.
He was also known for his delicate and remarkable way of dealing with people. At the stage of the theater Binev created eminent performances in plays as: Socrates by Guilherme Figueiredo, Amadeus by Peter Shaffer, The Dresser by Ronald Harwood, King John by Friedrich Dürrenmatt, When the Roses Dance by Valery Petrov and so on. He was honored twice with ASKEER, Bulgarian award of theater art.

Binev started his film career in the beginning of the 1960s. Most notable are his performances in Amendment to the Defense-of-State Act awarded with Golden Rose at FBFF Varna'76 (Festival for Bulgarian Featured Films) and  the TV series Nights with the White Horses with the memorable role as Academician Urumov for which he was awarded from the Union of Bulgarian Filmmakers and the city of Sofia. During the last years of his career Binev participated in some foreign productions as East/West (1999) with Catherine Deneuve.

He was decorated with the high government prize the Order of Saint Cyril and Saint Methodius.

In 2004 the Mladezhki Theater, together with Binev's wife Domna Ganeva, released a CD named Nikolay Binev singing. The edition includes some of his musical performances among which are arias from Verdi's operas and songs from the musical Yesterday by Lyubomir Denev.

Binev died in 2003 at the age of 69.

Filmography

Notes

References
Bulgarian National Film Archive 
Mladezhki Theater

External links
 

Bulgarian male stage actors
Bulgarian male film actors
1934 births
2003 deaths
People from Sliven